Ailill mac Fergusa (died 800) was King of South Brega of the Uí Chernaig sept of Lagore of the Síl nÁedo Sláine branch of the southern Ui Neill. He was the son of Fergus mac Fogartaig (died 751) and brother of Máel Dúin mac Fergusa (died 785), previous kings. he ruled from 797 to 800.

The annals record that he died from being thrown from a horse. He is styled rex Deisceirt Bregh-King of South Brega.

Notes

References 

Mac Niocaill, Gearoid (1972), Ireland before the Vikings, Dublin: Gill and Macmillan

External links
CELT: Corpus of Electronic Texts at University College Cork

Kings of Brega
8th-century Irish monarchs
Deaths by horse-riding accident in Ireland
800 deaths
Year of birth unknown